Compañía Primitiva de Gas de Buenos Aires Ltda. was a gas and electricity company of British origin, who operated in the city of Buenos Aires between 1854 and 1945.

History 

The company was founded in 1854 in Buenos Aires, and its plant was located in the area of Retiro, in the current Tower Monumental. The company was dedicated in its origins in provide the public lighting of the city. In 1895 the company began to carry out the works to supply electrical energy to the city of Buenos Aires. In 1897, the Board of the Primitiva acquired the Sociedad de Luz Eléctrica Edison, the main electrical plant of the city.

The Primitiva was dedicated to the Electric Lighting of Buenos Aires until 1920. year in which it lost the concession.

The Compañía Primitiva de Gas de Buenos Aires Ltda registered its name in 1901, and changed its original name in 1910 as Primitiva Gas and Electric Lighting Company of Buenos Aires. In 1901 the company's capital was £1,200,000 sterling.

In 1944 the national government decreed the nationalization of Compañía Primitiva de Gas. The company ceased its functions on March 5, 1945, taking charge of the management of the expropriated company Yacimientos Petrolíferos Fiscales.

The Primitiva Gas Company of Buenos Aires came to provide gas to a total of 240,000 users until its nationalization in 1944, distributing gas to the areas of Buenos Aires, La Plata, Bahia Blanca and Rosario. The company also counted on a fleet of trucks and motorcycles to provide care to its users.

References

External links 
Historias de Gas en Argentina

Oil and gas companies of Argentina
Companies based in Buenos Aires
Río de la Plata